Kevin Davies (born 15 May 1967) is a Bahamian professional football manager and former international player.

Managerial career
From July 2011 to September 2014 he coached the Bahamas national football team.

References

External links
Profile at Soccerway.com
Profile at Soccerpunter.com

1967 births
Living people
Place of birth missing (living people)
Bahamian footballers
Bahamas international footballers
Bahamian football managers
Bahamas national football team managers
Association football forwards